George Henry Arthur (born 10 March 1849 in Longford, Tasmania) was an Australian cricketer, who played for Tasmania; he represented the state in two first-class matches. His father, Charles Arthur, had the distinction of having participated in the first ever first-class cricket match in Australia, and his brother John Arthur also represented Tasmania.

Arthur died on 13 November 1932 in Longford.

See also
 List of Tasmanian representative cricketers

External links

1849 births
1932 deaths
Australian cricketers
Tasmania cricketers
Cricketers from Tasmania

ht:Charles Arthur